Ariankuppam is a legislative assembly constituency in the Union territory of Puducherry in India. Ariankuppam assembly constituency was part of Puducherry (Lok Sabha constituency).

Members of Legislative Assembly

Election results

2021

See also
 List of constituencies of the Puducherry Legislative Assembly
 Puducherry district

References 

 

Assembly constituencies of Puducherry
Ariyankuppam